Otto I, Count of Scheyern (some authors call him Otto II of Scheyern;  – before 4 December 1072) was the earliest known ancestor of the House of Wittelsbach whose relation with the House can be properly verified.

Life
Most historians believe Otto was a younger son of Heinrich I, Count of Pegnitz and an unnamed daughter of Kuno I, Count of Altdorf. He was appointed Vogt of Freising in Bavaria. A document from 1073 calls him , i.e. Count of Scheyern. Otto I died on December 4, 1072 while on a pilgrimage to Jerusalem.

Marriage and children
Otto was married twice.  His first wife was from Saxony but her given name has not been preserved. About 1057, he married Haziga of Diessen, daughter of Count Friedrich of Diessen.

Otto had 4 known children. By his first wife he had:
 Eckhard I.
 Bernard I, Count of Scheyern (d. 2 March abt. 1102).

By his second wife, Haziga, he had 2 children:
 Otto II (d. 1 Apr., abt. 1110).
 Arnold I, Count of Scheyern and Count of Dachau (d. c. 1123).

Ancestry

References

External links 
 Family tree of the Counts of Scheyern-Wittelsbach-Dachau-Valley, from a lecture by Prof. Schmid: Bayern im Spätmittelalter, winter 1996/97
 Otto I at genealogie-mittelalter

House of Wittelsbach
Counts of Germany
1020 births
1072 deaths
Year of birth uncertain
11th-century German nobility